Cadets Club is a Mauritian football club based in Quatre Bornes. They play in the Championnat de Maurice D2.

In 1986 the team has won the Mauritian League.

Stadium
Their home stadium is Stade Sir Guy Rozemont in Quatre Bornes.

Honours
Mauritian League
Champions (4): 1975, 1977, 1979, 1986

References

External links
 another club is there with the same name which is an organization of ex NCC cadets which is operating in Kerala. http://www.cadetsclub.in

Football clubs in Mauritius